"James" Tang Chi Lun (born 15 July 1975) is a Hong Kong racing driver currently competing in the TCR International Series. He competed in the Asian Le Mans Series and Hong Kong Touring Car Championship.

Racing career
Tang began his career in 2003 in the Hong Kong Touring Car Championship, he raced there for two seasons, before starting his career in drifting. After drifting for a few years he returned to the Hong Kong Touring Car Championship for two seasons. He took part in the REd Bull Drift Battle in 2015 and 2016, finishing within the top ten both years. He switched to the Asian Le Mans Series for the 2016–17 season.

In November 2016 it was announced that he would race in the TCR International Series, driving a Honda Civic TCR for Team TRC.

Racing record

Complete TCR International Series results
(key) (Races in bold indicate pole position) (Races in italics indicate fastest lap)

† Driver did not finish the race, but was classified as he completed over 90% of the race distance.

References

External links
 
 
 

Living people
TCR International Series drivers
Hong Kong racing drivers
1975 births
World Touring Car Cup drivers
Craft-Bamboo Racing drivers